Selim Hobart Peabody (August 20, 1829 – May 26, 1903) was an American educator.

Biography 
Selim Peabody was born in Rockingham, Vermont. He graduated at the University of Vermont in 1852, during the following years held professorships of mathematics, physics, and engineering at several colleges, and from 1880 to 1891 was president of the University of Illinois. In 1893, he was chief of the department of liberal arts at the World's Columbian Exposition, in 1899–1900 editor and statistician of the United States Commission to the Paris Exposition, and in 1900 superintendent of the division of liberal arts at the Pan-American Exposition. From 1892 to 1895, he served as president of the Chicago Academy of Sciences and from 1889 to 1891 as president of the National Council of Education. Peabody was an associate editor of the International Cyclopædia, under Editor-in-Chief Harry Thurston Peck.

He died in St. Louis on May 26, 1903.

Selected publications 
 Astronomy (1869)
 Juvenile Natural History (three volumes, 1869)
 New Practical Arithmetic (1872)
 American Patriotism (1880)
 Charts of Arithmetic (1900)
 Peabody Genealogy (Paybody, Pabody, Pabodie) (1909), Compiled by Selim Hobart Peabody, LL. D., Edited by Charles Henry Pope, Boston, Mass., Charles H. Pope, Publisher, Pope Building, (Advance funding by Mr. Frank Everett Peabody)

References 

 

1829 births
1903 deaths
19th-century American mathematicians
American non-fiction writers
Leaders of the University of Illinois
People from Rockingham, Vermont
University of Vermont alumni
Writers from Vermont